Giovanni Giancaspro (born 21 April 1988), known professionally as Gio Evan, is an Italian writer, poet and singer-songwriter.

He participated at Sanremo Music Festival 2021 with the song "Arnica".

Works

Poems 
Teorema di un salto (2015)
Passa a sorprendermi (2016)
Capita a volte che ti penso sempre (2017)
Ormai tra noi è tutto infinito (2018)
Se c'è un posto bello sei te (2020)

Novels 
 La bella maniera (2014)
 Cento cuori dentro (2019)
 I ricordi preziosi di Noah Gingols (2020)

Discography

Studio albums 
 Biglietto di solo ritorno (2018)
 Natura molta (2019)
 Mareducato (2021)

Singles 
 "Più in alto" (2017)
 "Posti" (2017)
 "Pane in cassetta" (2018)
 "A piedi il mondo" (2018)
 "Joseph Beuys" (2018)
 "Himalaya Cocktail" (2019)
 "Amazzonia" (2019)
 "Scudo" (2019)
 "Klimt" (2019)
 "Regali fatti a mano" (2020)
 "Glenn Miller" (2020)
 "Arnica" (2021)

References

External links

Italian male poets
Italian male novelists
Italian  male singer-songwriters
Living people
21st-century Italian poets
21st-century Italian  male singers
21st-century Italian male  writers
21st-century Italian novelists
1988 births
People from Molfetta